Trevor Taylor is a male former international table tennis player from England.

Table tennis career
He represented England at four World Table Tennis Championships in the Swaythling Cup (men's team event) from 1969-1975.

He won four English National Table Tennis Championships titles and represented Hertfordshire at county level and Ormesby at club level.

Personal life
His brother Peter Taylor was also an international player.

See also
 List of England players at the World Team Table Tennis Championships

References

English male table tennis players